Tormelin  is a town and sub-prefecture in the Fria Prefecture in the Boké Region of western Guinea. As of 2014 it had a population of 12,613 people.

References

Sub-prefectures of the Boké Region